Charles Griffen Cornell (February 12, 1827 New York City – April 16, 1906, NYC) was a New York State senator.

Life
He was a butcher. He was a Councilman (5th D.) in 1858 and 1859; President of the Board of Councilmen in 1859; and an Alderman (10th D.) in 1860 and 1861.

Having been a State Militia officer, he joined the Union Army at the beginning of the American Civil War, and fought in the First Battle of Bull Run.

He was a member of the New York State Senate (5th D.) in 1862 and 1863.

On December 3, 1862, Cornell was appointed by Mayor George Opdyke as New York City Street Commissioner. He resigned on November 17, 1866.

He was again a member of the State Senate in 1866 and 1867.

He was a member of the New York State Assembly (New York Co., 14th D.) in 1873.

Sources

 The New York Civil List compiled by Franklin Benjamin Hough, Stephen C. Hutchins and Edgar Albert Werner (1870; pg. 443)
 Biographical Sketches of the State Officers and the Members of the Legislature of the State of New York in 1862 and '63 by William D. Murphy (1863; pg. 62ff)
 Manual of the Corporation of the City of New York by D. T. Valentine (1866; pg. 414)
 Manual of the Corporation of New York by Joseph Shannon (1869; pg. 597)
 CITY CORRUPTION; Charges Against the Street Commissioner, Charles G. Cornell in NYT on October 11, 1866
 RESIGNATION OF STREET COMMISSIONER CORNELL in NYT on November 18, 1866
 Dismissal of the Charges Against Ex-Street Commissioner Cornell in NYT on November 27, 1866
 MAYOR HEWITT SCORES ONE; ...ATTEMPT TO APPOINT CHARLES G. CORNELL BLOCKED... in NYT on July 20, 1887

1827 births
1906 deaths
Democratic Party New York (state) state senators
New York City Council members
People of New York (state) in the American Civil War
Democratic Party members of the New York State Assembly
Union Army officers
19th-century American politicians